Yvon L'Heureux (20 March 1914 – 29 May 1984) was a Liberal party member of the House of Commons of Canada. He was a manufacturer and merchant by career.

He was first elected at the Chambly—Rouville riding in the 1957 general election. After serving his term in the 23rd Canadian Parliament, L'Heureux was defeated in the 1958 election by Maurice Johnson of the Progressive Conservative Party.

L'Heureux returned to Parliament in a 31 May 1971 by-election at the Chambly riding following the death of incumbent Liberal member Bernard Pilon. After re-election in the 1972 federal election, L'Heureux returned to serve his term in the 29th Parliament. After this, he left federal office in 1974 and did not campaign in that year's federal election.

Election results

External links
 

1914 births
1984 deaths
Members of the House of Commons of Canada from Quebec
Liberal Party of Canada MPs